Last Refuge is a French film from 1947, directed by Marc Maurette, written by Maurice Griffe and Marc Maurette, and starring Raymond Rouleau. The film featured Louis de Funès in a supporting role.

Cast 
 Raymond Rouleau: Philippe
 Giselle Pascal: Antoinette Baron
 Félicien Tramel: Mr. Baron
 Noël Roquevert: Beauchamp
 Mila Parély: Sylvie
 Marcelle Monthil: Mrs. Baron
 Louis de Funès: the driver

Reception
The film wasn't successful.

References

External links 
 
 

1947 films
1940s French-language films
Films based on Belgian novels
Films based on works by Georges Simenon
French black-and-white films
French drama films
1947 drama films
1940s French films